The Royal Regiment of Fusiliers Museum (Royal Warwickshire) is situated on the first floor of St John's House in Warwick, England.

History
The trustees of the museum joined forces with Warwickshire County Council to acquire the building in 1961. The Council opened their museum of the ground floor and the trusteesof the regimental museum occupied the first floor. Both museums were opened by Field Marshal Viscount Montgomery on 2 August 1961. The Royal Regiment of Fusiliers Museum was reopened by his son in 2001 following a major refurbishment with the help of the Heritage Lottery Fund.

Collections
The museum tells the history of the County infantry Regiment. This includes the present Regiment, the Royal Regiment of Fusiliers and the antecedent Regiments going down the line of the Royal Warwickshire Fusiliers (the Royal Warwickshire Regiment and the 6th Regiment of Foot).

The museum is an Accredited museum (a national scheme run by the Arts Council), a registered charity, governed by a group of trustees, and is supported by the Ministry of Defence. The Royal Regiment of Fusiliers was created in 1968 after the amalgamation of four regiments. Thus the museum is part of a family of other Fusilier museums: the Fusiliers Museum of Northumberland in Alnwick Castle, the Fusilier Museum (Lancashire) in Bury and the Fusiliers Museum (London) at the Tower of London.

In November 2020, the museum purchased at auction the Memorial Plaque of Euan Lucie-Smith of the Royal Warwickshire's 1st Battalion, one of the first mixed-heritage infantry officers in a regular British Army regiment, and the first killed in World War I, at the Second Battle of Ypres on 25 April 1915 .

References

External links
Official website
General website on regimental museums

History museums in Warwickshire
Regimental museums in England
Royal Regiment of Fusiliers
Buildings and structures in Warwick